William Hutchinson (born 4 August 1998) is a Scottish professional boxer. As an amateur he won a gold medal at the 2016 Youth World Championships in the middleweight division.

Amateur career
Hutchinson is regarded as one of Scotland's most successful amateur boxers, winning gold medals at the 2014 European Junior Championships and 2016 Youth World Championships—becoming the first Scottish boxer to win gold at an amateur World Championships.

Professional career
Under the tutelage of renowned Cuban trainer, Ismael Salas, and being guided by David Haye's RingStar Promotions with Shelly Finkel as manager, Hutchinson made his professional debut on 20 October 2017, scoring a first-round technical knockout (TKO) victory against Attila Nagy at the indigo at The O2 in London.

He scored another TKO victory in December—defeating Cyrille Joly in the second round—followed by a six-round points decision (PTS) victory against Eric Mokonzo in February 2018. After his win over Mokonzo, Hutchinson switched trainers from Salas to Dominic Ingle.

In the following May it was announced that Hutchinson had also switched promoters, signing with Frank Warren's Queensberry Promotions.

Professional boxing record

References

External links

Living people
1998 births
Scottish male boxers
Sportspeople from South Lanarkshire
Middleweight boxers
Light-heavyweight boxers